The Yuan Shikai Cabinet was the second cabinet of the Qing dynasty and of China, led by Prime Minister Yuan Shikai from 2 November 1911 to the abdication of the Xuantong Emperor in February 1912.

History 
In 1911, the Wuchang Uprising broke out, and Prince Qing stepped down from his position as Prime Minister. General Yuan Shikai was summoned back to put down the rebellion and was also appointed Prime Minister. His cabinet was set up on 16 November 1911.

Composition 
The following is a list of ministers in the cabinet:

References 

Government of the Qing dynasty
Cabinets established in 1911
Cabinets disestablished in 1912